Judith Dornys was a Hungarian-born Canadian dancer and film actress.

Selected filmography
 Ramona (1961)
 The Curse of the Hidden Vault (1964)
 Call of the Forest (1965)
 The Sweet Sins of Sexy Susan (1967)
 Sexy Susan Sins Again (1968)
 House of Pleasure (1969)

References

Bibliography
 Bergfelder, Tim. International Adventures: German Popular Cinema and European Co-Productions in the 1960s. Berghahn Books, 2005.

External links

1941 births
1989 deaths
Hungarian film actresses
Hungarian female dancers
Actresses from Budapest
Hungarian emigrants to Canada